Bluebird Airways is an airline with its head office on the property of Heraklion International Airport in Heraklion, Greece.

History 
Bluebird Airways is a Greek airline, established in 2008 in Heraklion, Crete, Greece and is mainly involved in the transportation of passengers and cargo from Tel Aviv according to schedule and charter flights.

Destinations

Fleet

Current fleet

The Bluebird Airways fleet includes the following aircraft as of December  2022:

Fleet development
In 2013, Bluebird Airways added MD83 YR-HBH (170Y), MD82 YR-MDK (160Y), MD82 YR-OTN (160Y), to its fleet on wet-lease, in order to operate seasonal scheduled flights. On 26 July 2016, Bluebird Airways added Boeing 737-3Y0 9H-TAS to its fleet. In September the plane made its first flights from Heraklion to Tel-Aviv and back. In July 2017, Bluebird Airways added Boeing 737-33A 9H-NOA to its fleet.

References

External links

Bluebird Airways at CH-Aviation

Airlines established in 2008
Airlines of Greece
Greek brands
Greek companies established in 2008